The 2020–21 Coupe de France preliminary rounds, Méditerranée was the qualifying competition to decide which teams from the leagues of the Méditerranée region of France took part in the main competition from the seventh round.

A total of four teams qualified from the Méditerranée Preliminary rounds. In 2019–20, Athlético Marseille progressed furthest in the main competition, reaching the round of 32 before losing to Rennes 0–2.

Schedule
The number of teams entering from the region, combined with the changes to the number of teams qualifying for the seventh round, meant a preliminary round was required for the 96 teams from District 2 and below, to be played on 23 August 2020. Remaining District 2, District 1 and Régional 2 teams entered at the first round stage on 30 August 2020. Teams from Régional 1 entered at the second round stage on 6 September 2020.

The third round draw, which saw the teams from Championnat National 3 enter, took place on 9 September 2020. The fourth round draw, which saw the teams from Championnat National 2 enter, took place on 24 September 2020. The fifth round draw was made on 8 October 2020. The sixth round draw was made on 22 October 2020.

Preliminary round
These matches were played on 22, 23 and 26 August 2020.

First round
These matches were played on 30 August 2020, with one postponed to 2 September 2020. Tiers are not yet known for all district sides. Unknown tiers indicated with (*)

Second round
These matches were played on 5 and 6 September 2020.

Third round
These matches were played on 19 and 20 September 2020, with one postponed to 23 September 2020 and one to 30 September 2020.

Fourth round
These matches were played on 3 and 4 October 2020.

Fifth round
These matches were played on 17 and 18 October 2020.

Sixth round
These matches were played on 31 January 2021.

References

Preliminary rounds